Mary "Molly" Reckford (born October 9, 1992) is an American rower. She competed in the women's lightweight double sculls event at the 2020 Summer Olympics.

Raised in the Short Hills section of Millburn, New Jersey, Reckford attended The Hudson School, Phillips Exeter Academy and Dartmouth College. She is the granddaughter of Olympian Bill Spencer (biathlete), niece of Jonathan Reckford and great-granddaughter of U.S. Representative Millicent Fenwick.

References

External links
 Dartmouth Big Green bio
 

1992 births
Living people
American female rowers
Olympic rowers of the United States
Rowers at the 2020 Summer Olympics
Place of birth missing (living people)
Dartmouth Big Green women's rowers
Phillips Exeter Academy alumni
People from Millburn, New Jersey
Sportspeople from Essex County, New Jersey
The Hudson School alumni
21st-century American women
World Rowing Championships medalists for the United States